Forty-Hour Week Convention, 1935 is  an International Labour Organization Convention.

It was established in 1935, with the preamble stating:
Considering that in pursuance of the Resolutions adopted by the Eighteenth and Nineteenth Sessions of the International Labour Conference it is necessary that a continuous effort should be made to reduce hours of work in all forms of employment to such extent as is possible;...

Ratifications
As of 2023, the convention has been ratified by 15 states.

External links 
Text.
Ratifications.

International Labour Organization conventions
Working time
Treaties concluded in 1935
Treaties entered into force in 1957
Treaties of Australia
Treaties of Azerbaijan
Treaties of the Byelorussian Soviet Socialist Republic
Treaties of Finland
Treaties of South Korea
Treaties of Kyrgyzstan
Treaties of Lithuania
Treaties of Moldova
Treaties of New Zealand
Treaties of Norway
Treaties of the Soviet Union
Treaties of Sweden
Treaties of Tajikistan
Treaties of the Ukrainian Soviet Socialist Republic
Treaties of Uzbekistan
Treaties extended to Norfolk Island
1935 in labor relations